Luis Alberto Scola Balvoa (born April 30, 1980) is an Argentine former professional basketball player and current executive who currently serves as the chief executive officer for the Italian Lega Basket Serie A (LBA) team Pallacanestro Varese. A three-time All-EuroLeague selection with Tau Ceramica, he signed with the Houston Rockets in 2007 and was voted to the NBA All-Rookie First Team. Later on, he played for the Phoenix Suns, Indiana Pacers, Toronto Raptors and Brooklyn Nets.

Scola has been a regular member of the Argentina national basketball team since 1999, winning an Olympic gold team medal in 2004 and a bronze team medal in the 2008 Summer Olympics.

In 2010 Scola won the Konex Award Merit Diploma as one of the five best basketball players from the last decade in Argentina. He was honored as the national flag bearer at the 2016 Summer Olympics.

Professional career

Ferro Carril Oeste (1995–1998)
Scola started his career with the Buenos Aires youth teams of Ferro Carril Oeste. He made his professional debut with the same club's pro team in the Argentine league during the 1995–96 season at age 15.

Gijón (1998–2000)
After the 1997–98 basketball season in the Argentine League, Scola moved to Spain and signed with Saski Baskonia. He was loaned to Gijón Baloncesto, where he helped the then Spanish League Second Division club achieve promotion to the Spanish League First Division. He then was loaned back to Gijón through the 1999–2000 season before arriving at Baskonia, where he played for seven seasons.

Baskonia (2000–2007)
With Saski Baskonia, Scola reached the EuroLeague Finals in the 2000–01 season, and three consecutive EuroLeague Final Fours, between 2005 and 2007. His outstanding performances earned him an All-EuroLeague Second Team selection in 2005, as well as two All-EuroLeague First Team selections in 2006 and 2007.

Although Scola did not win the EuroLeague championship with Baskonia, he did win with them every major Spanish League title, winning a Spanish ACB League championship in 2002, three Spanish King's Cups in 2002, 2004, 2006, and three Spanish Supercups in 2005, 2006, 2007.

Houston Rockets (2007–2012) 
In the summer of 2005, the San Antonio Spurs of the NBA (who drafted Scola in 2002) attempted to negotiate with Baskonia to buy out his contract. The teams settled on a number of over $3 million for the buyout of the contract. This made it difficult for Scola to join fellow Argentina national team member Manu Ginóbili in San Antonio because of the NBA's rule, which limits teams to paying no more than $500,000 of a player's buyout. Scola would have been responsible for paying Baskonia the remaining $2.5 million amount of the buyout. When the deal to buy out Scola's contract fell through, the Spurs instead signed an Argentine national team teammate and friend of Scola's, Fabricio Oberto.

On July 12, 2007, the Spurs traded the rights to Scola, along with center-forward Jackie Butler, to the Houston Rockets, in return for Vassilis Spanoulis, a future second-round draft pick, and cash considerations. He signed with the Rockets soon after and his US$3.2 million buyout was completed a few days later. Scola signed a three-year contract with the Rockets at a salary of $9.5 million. Scola placed third in the NBA 2007–08 Rookie of the Year Award voting and he was also named to the NBA All-Rookie First Team. On March 13, 2010, he scored a career-high 44 points against the New Jersey Nets.

On the afternoon of December 8, 2011, the day before the 2011 NBA lockout ended, and players could move between teams, the Rockets, the Los Angeles Lakers and the New Orleans Hornets agreed to a trade that would have sent Scola, along with Goran Dragić, Kevin Martin, and Lamar Odom to the Hornets. In exchange, the Rockets would have received Pau Gasol, and the Lakers would have received star point guard Chris Paul. After other team owners voiced their opposition that night, league commissioner David Stern nullified the trade.

On July 13, 2012, he was waived by the Rockets using the league's amnesty clause to provide salary cap relief. It was widely noted, however, that Scola was not cut due to a lack of performance; rather, the deal was an attempt to clear cap space for the Rockets to trade for former Orlando Magic All-Star center Dwight Howard. Howard was instead traded to the Los Angeles Lakers, but the Rockets used their cap space to gain former Oklahoma City Thunder Sixth Man of the Year shooting guard and Olympic gold medalist James Harden.

Phoenix Suns (2012–2013)

On July 15, 2012, Scola was claimed off amnesty waivers by the Phoenix Suns. Reportedly, the Dallas Mavericks and the Cleveland Cavaliers were also interested in acquiring him during the amnesty process. On November 21, 2012, he was relegated to playing off the bench for the first time in his NBA career since the start of his rookie season. He regained his starting spot less than a month later, and on December 29, he scored a season-high 33 points against the Minnesota Timberwolves. While Scola did become a leader for the Suns, he finished the season with declining averages, as his 12.8 points per game were his lowest since the 2008–09 season.

Indiana Pacers (2013–2015)
On July 27, 2013, the Suns traded Scola to the Indiana Pacers in exchange for Gerald Green, Miles Plumlee, and a future second-round draft pick. In his two seasons for the Pacers, he played a back-up power forward role to David West as he started just 18 games over his two-year stint.

Toronto Raptors (2015–2016)
On July 15, 2015, Scola signed with the Toronto Raptors. He made his debut for the Raptors in their season opener on October 28, recording eight rebounds while taking no field goal attempts in a 106–99 win over the Indiana Pacers. He helped the Raptors make the Eastern Conference Finals in 2016 for the first time in franchise history.

Brooklyn Nets (2016–2017)
On July 13, 2016, Scola signed with the Brooklyn Nets. He made his debut for the Nets in their season opener on October 26, scoring eight points in a 122–117 loss to the Boston Celtics.

Scola's final NBA game was played on February 13, 2017, in a 103 - 112 loss to the Memphis Grizzlies, where he recorded four assists and four rebounds but no points in 15 minutes of playing time. On February 27, 2017, he was waived by the Nets.

Shanxi Brave Dragons (2017–2018)
On July 9, 2017, Scola signed with the Shanxi Brave Dragons of the Chinese Basketball Association.

Shanghai Sharks (2018–2019)
On August 10, 2018, Scola signed with the Shanghai Sharks of the Chinese Basketball Association.

Olimpia Milano (2019–2020)
On September 29, 2019, Olimpia Milano head coach, Ettore Messina, during the press conference of the 2nd round match of the 2019–20 LBA season lost against Germani Basket Brescia, announced that Scola had signed with the team for the rest of season. On June 11, 2020, Scola left Olimpia Milano.

Varese (2020–2021) 
On July 1, 2020, Scola announced that he would play at least one year more before retirement and signed with Pallacanestro Varese of the LBA for the 2020–21 season with an option to extend for the following year.

Post-playing career
On September 20, 2021, Pallacanestro Varese announced that Scola would re-join them as Chief executive officer.

National team career

Junior national team

With Argentina's junior national teams, Scola won the gold medal at the 1995 South American Cadet Championship, the gold medal at the 1996 South American Junior Championship, the gold medal at the 2000 FIBA Americas Under-20 Championship, and the bronze medal at the 2001 FIBA Under-21 World Cup.

Senior national team
As a member of the senior Argentina national team, Scola has won multiple medals: the silver medal at the 1999 South American Championship, the bronze medal at the 1999 FIBA Americas Championship, the gold medal at the 2001 FIBA Americas Championship, the silver medal at the 2002 FIBA World Championship, the silver medal at the 2003 FIBA Americas Championship, the gold medal at the 2004 Summer Olympics, the silver medal at the 2007 FIBA Americas Championship, the bronze medal at the 2008 Summer Olympics, the bronze medal at the 2009 FIBA Americas Championship, the gold medal at the 2011 FIBA Americas Championship and the bronze medal at the 2013 FIBA Americas Championship among other titles. At the 2015 FIBA Americas Championship tournament, Scola became the all-time leading scorer in FIBA AmeriCup history and won his 4th tournament MVP.

Scola broke two records of the Argentina national team at the FIBA World Cup, during the 2010 edition: top overall scorer for Argentina at a World Cup (beating Ernesto Gehrmann's 331 points) and most points scored for Argentina in one game at a World Cup (scoring 37 against Brazil in the round of 16, therefore beating Alberto Desimone's 35 points scored against Mexico in 1963).

In 2019, at 39 years old, he was part of the team that won the gold medal at the Pan American Games.

At the 2019 FIBA World Cup, he scored 135 points and 57 rebounds in the seven matches en route to the final. Scola scored 23 points against Nigeria in a preliminary round of the 2019 World Cup game at Wuhan, giving him a total of 611 points in his World Cup career. With this, Scola passed Andrew Gaze's total of 594 and is now second only to Brazilian scoring great Oscar Schmidt's 906 points in the tournament.

Scola scored a team-high 23 points in a loss to Slovenia in the preliminary round of the 2020 Olympics in Tokyo.

Play was paused during Scola's final game at the 2020 Summer Olympics when his Argentinian team was playing Australia. With less than a minute left in the game, Scola was checked out, and players from both teams, coaches, and those in the stadium gave him a standing ovation out of respect. The referee's allowed this pause in the game as they understood the importance of the occasion.

Titles and medals

Club level
 Spanish League Champion: (2002)
 3× Spanish King's Cup Winner: (2002, 2004, 2006)
 3× Spanish Supercup Winner: (2005, 2006, 2007)

Argentina national team
 1995 South American Cadet Championship: 
 1996 South American Junior Championship: 
 1999 South American Championship: 
 1999 FIBA Americas Championship: 
 2000 FIBA Americas Under-20 Championship: 
 2001 FIBA Under-21 World Cup: 
 2001 FIBA Americas Championship: 
 2002 FIBA World Championship: 
 2003 FIBA Americas Championship: 
 2004 Summer Olympics: 
 2007 FIBA Americas Championship: 
 2008 FIBA Diamond Ball: 
 2008 Summer Olympics: 
 2009 FIBA Americas Championship: 
 2011 FIBA Americas Championship: 
 2013 FIBA Americas Championship: 
 2015 FIBA Americas Championship: 
 2017 FIBA AmeriCup: 
 2019 Pan American Games: 
 2019 FIBA World Championship:

Awards

Club level
 Spanish League: Rookie of the Year (2000)
 Spanish Supercup: MVP (2005)
 All-EuroLeague Second Team: (2005)
 2× Spanish League MVP: (2005, 2007)
 4× All-Spanish League Team: (2004, 2005, 2006, 2007)
 2× All-EuroLeague First Team: (2006, 2007)
 NBA All-Rookie First Team: (2008)
 2016 NBA Atlantic Division Sportsmanship Award

Argentina junior national team
 2000 FIBA Americas Under-20 Championship: MVP
 2001 FIBA Under-21 World Cup: All-Tournament Team

Argentina senior national team
 2007 FIBA Americas Championship: MVP
 2009 FIBA Americas Championship: MVP & Top Scorer
 2010 FIBA World Championship: All-Tournament Team & Top Scorer
 2011 FIBA Americas Championship: All-Tournament Team & MVP & Top Scorer
 2013 FIBA Americas Championship: All-Tournament Team & Top Scorer
 2015 FIBA Americas Championship: All-Tournament Team & MVP & Top Scorer
 2019 FIBA World Championship: All-Tournament Team

Career statistics

NBA

Regular season

|-
| style="text-align:left;"| 
| style="text-align:left;"| Houston
| 82 || 39 || 24.7 || .515 || .000 || .668 || 6.4 || 1.3 || .7 || .2 || 10.3
|-
| style="text-align:left;"| 
| style="text-align:left;"| Houston
| 82 || 82 || 30.3 || .531 || .000 || .760 || 8.8 || 1.5 || .8 || .1 || 12.7
|-
| style="text-align:left;"| 
| style="text-align:left;"| Houston
| 82 || 82 || 32.6 || .514 || .200 || .779 || 8.6 || 2.1 || .8 || .3 || 16.2
|-
| style="text-align:left;"| 
| style="text-align:left;"| Houston
| 74 || 74 || 32.6 || .504 || .000 || .738 || 8.2 || 2.5 || .6 || .6 || 18.3
|-
| style="text-align:left;"| 
| style="text-align:left;"| Houston
| 66 || 66 || 31.3 || .491 || .000 || .773 || 6.5 || 2.1 || .5 || .4 || 15.5
|-
| style="text-align:left;"| 
| style="text-align:left;"| Phoenix
| 82 || 67 || 26.6 || .473 || .188 || .787 || 6.6 || 2.2 || .8 || .4 || 12.8
|-
| style="text-align:left;"| 
| style="text-align:left;"| Indiana
| 82 || 2 || 17.1 || .470 || .143 || .728 || 4.8 || 1.0 || .3 || .2 || 7.6
|-
| style="text-align:left;"| 
| style="text-align:left;"| Indiana
| 81 || 16 || 20.5 || .467 || .250 || .699 || 6.5 || 1.3 || .6 || .2 || 9.4
|-
| style="text-align:left;"| 
| style="text-align:left;"| Toronto
| 76 || 76 || 21.5 || .450 || .404 || .726 || 4.7 || .9 || .6 || .4 || 8.7
|-
| style="text-align:left;"| 
| style="text-align:left;"| Brooklyn
| 36 || 1 || 12.8 || .470 || .340 || .676 || 3.9 || 1.0 || .4 || .1 || 5.1
|- class="sortbottom"
| style="text-align:center;" colspan="2"| Career
| 743 || 505 || 25.6 || .493 || .339 || .740 || 6.7 || 1.6 || .6 || .3 || 12.0

Playoffs

|-
| style="text-align:left;"| 2008
| style="text-align:left;"| Houston
| 6 || 6 || 36.7 || .448 || .000 || .686 || 9.3 || 1.3 || .7 || .2 || 14.0
|-
| style="text-align:left;"| 2009
| style="text-align:left;"| Houston
| 13 || 13 || 32.6 || .494 || .000 || .673 || 8.4 || 1.8 || .5 || .2 || 14.4
|-
| style="text-align:left;"| 2014
| style="text-align:left;"| Indiana
| 17 || 0 || 13.9 || .465 || .333 || .591 || 2.5 || .5 || .4 || .2 || 6.1
|-
| style="text-align:left;"| 2016
| style="text-align:left;"| Toronto
| 11 || 9 || 12.7 || .258 || .190 || .727 || 1.6 || .6 || .3 || .0 || 2.5
|- class="sortbottom"
| style="text-align:center;" colspan="2"| Career
| 48 || 28 || 21.4 || .454 || .200 || .667 || 4.7 || 1.0 || .4 || .1 || 8.5

EuroLeague

|-
| style="text-align:left;"| 2000–01
| style="text-align:left;" rowspan=7| TAU Cerámica
| 22 || 5 || 18.3 || .547 || .000 || .538 || 4.4 || .7 || 1.0 || .1 || 8.7 || 7.0
|-
| style="text-align:left;"| 2001–02
| 20 || 3 || 23.7 || .689 || .333 || .670 || 4.6 || 1.1 || 1.3 || .3 || 15.9 || 16.8
|-
| style="text-align:left;"| 2002–03
| 16 || 9 || 24.7 || .546 || .000 || .677 || 5.0 || 1.3 || .9 || .3 || 15.1 || 13.0
|-
| style="text-align:left;"| 2003–04
| 14 || 6 || 28.8 || .604 || .000 || .765 || 6.1 || 2.4 || 1.4 || .4 || 15.2 || 16.8
|-
| style="text-align:left;"| 2004–05
| 24 || 21 || 24.7 || .564 || .000 || .676 || 6.5 || 1.9 || 1.3 || .7 || 15.1 || 16.9
|-
| style="text-align:left;"| 2005–06
| 25 || 24 || 28.6 || .536 || .000 || .679 || 6.7 || 2.2 || 1.6 || .8 || 14.8 || 18.8
|-
| style="text-align:left;"| 2006–07
| 23 || 18 || 26.5 || .573 || .000 || .708 || 5.9 || 2.2 || .9 || .3 || 15.5 || 17.9
|- class="sortbottom"
| style="text-align:center;" colspan="2"| Career
| 144 || 86 || 25.6 || .577 || .091 || .671 || 5.6 || 1.7 || 1.2 || .5 || 14.3 || 15.4

Personal life
Scola and his wife, fellow Argentine Pamela, have four children together. He also holds a Spanish passport.

On July 18, 2017, Scola was named as an ambassador for the 2018 Summer Youth Olympics in Buenos Aires.

See also 
 List of athletes with the most appearances at Olympic Games
 List of Olympic medalists in basketball

References

External links

 Luis Scola at acb.com 
 Luis Scola at euroleague.net
 
 

1980 births
Living people
2002 FIBA World Championship players
2006 FIBA World Championship players
2010 FIBA World Championship players
2014 FIBA Basketball World Cup players
2019 FIBA Basketball World Cup players
Argentine expatriate basketball people in China
Argentine expatriate basketball people in Italy
Argentine expatriate basketball people in Spain
Argentine expatriate basketball people in the United States
Argentine men's basketball players
Argentine people of Italian descent
Basketball players at the 2004 Summer Olympics
Basketball players at the 2008 Summer Olympics
Basketball players at the 2012 Summer Olympics
Basketball players at the 2016 Summer Olympics
Basketball players at the 2019 Pan American Games
Basketball players at the 2020 Summer Olympics
Basketball players from Buenos Aires
Brooklyn Nets players
Centers (basketball)
Ferro Carril Oeste basketball players
Gijón Baloncesto players
Houston Rockets players
Indiana Pacers players
Lega Basket Serie A players
Liga ACB players
Medalists at the 2004 Summer Olympics
Medalists at the 2008 Summer Olympics
National Basketball Association players from Argentina
Olimpia Milano players
Olympic basketball players of Argentina
Olympic bronze medalists for Argentina
Olympic gold medalists for Argentina
Olympic medalists in basketball
Pallacanestro Varese players
Pan American Games gold medalists for Argentina
Pan American Games medalists in basketball
Phoenix Suns players
Power forwards (basketball)
San Antonio Spurs draft picks
Saski Baskonia players
Shanghai Sharks players
Shanxi Loongs players
Toronto Raptors players
Medalists at the 2019 Pan American Games